What Was Said (released January 29, 2016, on the ECM label) is an album by pianist Tord Gustavsen, vocalist Simin Tander and drummer Jarle Vespestad.

Reception

The Allmusic review by Thom Jurek awarded What Was Said 4 stars and stated "This band incorporates improvisational elements into the core of each composition, and the role of the singer is as a co-conspirator in the creation of the moment.". They also selected it as one of their Favorite Jazz Albums of 2016.

Writing in The Guardian, John Fordham called it "returning to simple songs with religious roots, and to collaboration with a remarkable singer".

The All About Jazz review by Mark Sullivan said that "However unorthodox all this cross-translation seems, Tander makes it sound completely natural. Her intimate, lyrical voice is equally at home in both languages, as well as singing wordless vocalise and improvising. Gustavson still plays the piano as his main instrument, but has augmented it with discreet electronics and occasional synthesizer bass, while Vespestad provides percussive textures or timekeeping as required. So the group is a true trio, not just a vocalist with accompanists."

The album was awarded Album of the year by The German Record Critics' Award.

Track listing

Personnel
 Tord Gustavsen – piano
 Simin Tander – vocals
 Jarle Vespestad – drums

References

ECM Records albums
Tord Gustavsen albums
2016 albums
Albums produced by Manfred Eicher